Narcetes erimelas is a species of fish in the family Alepocephalidae (slickheads). The fish is found worldwide.

References

Markle, D.F. and Y.I. Sazanov, 1990. Alepocephalidae. p. 246-264. In J.C. Quero, J.C. Hureau, C. Karrer, A. Post and L. Saldanha (eds.) Check-list of the fishes of the eastern tropical Atlantic (CLOFETA). JNICT, Lisbon; SEI, Paris; and UNESCO, Paris. Vol. 1. 

Alepocephalidae
Taxa named by Alfred William Alcock
Fish described in 1890